Ram Sarup Lugani (known as R.S.Lugani) (25 January 1927 – 22 May 2021) was an educationist who pioneered the Delhi Public School, R. K. Puram.

Early life
Lugani has completed his education from Punjab and Agra University. Lugani has acquired teaching and administration experience from Manchester Grammar School, UK. His father was a Sanskrit teacher.

Career
Lugani was the first headmaster and principal of Delhi Public School, R. K. Puram.

Award
In 1992 he received the prestigious Padma Shri Award for Excellence in Literature & Education.

References

1927 births
2021 deaths
20th-century Indian educational theorists
People from Delhi
Recipients of the Padma Shri in literature & education